The 2011 Michelin Ginetta GT Supercup season will be the inaugural Ginetta GT Supercup season, having rebranded from the Ginetta G50 Cup, which ran between 2008 and 2010. The season will begin at Brands Hatch on 4 April and will finish after 27 races over 10 rounds at Sliverstone on 16 October, supporting all rounds of the British Touring Car Championship.

The season sees a new direction for the series with a move towards a GT style class structure with two cars eligible to race in the championship.

The winner of the G55 Championship will win a fully paid drive in a Next Generation Touring Car in the 2012 British Touring Car Championship.

Teams and drivers

Race calendar and results
All races were held in the United Kingdom. The series lasted for 27 races over 10 rounds and supported the British Touring Car Championship at all rounds.

Championship standings

Ginetta GT Winter Cup
The Ginetta GT Winter Cup was planned as to be the inaugural Ginetta GT Winter Cup. The series was set to feature two 2-hour endurance races, incorporating Ginetta G40, G50 and G55 models, however the championship was shelved.|}

References

External links
 Official website

Ginetta GT